Kolah Pa (also Romanized as Kolah Pā; also known as Kolā Pā) is a village in Agahan Rural District, Kolyai District, Sonqor County, Kermanshah Province, Iran. At the 2006 census, its population was 104, in 23 families.

References 

Populated places in Sonqor County